Foundation Stone is the name of the rock situated under the Dome of the Rock in Jerusalem.

Music
Foundation Stone - the name of a music band, see FloydFest

See also
Foundation stone